Schefflera troyana is a species of plant in the family Araliaceae. It is endemic to Jamaica.  It is threatened by habitat loss.

References

troyana
Vulnerable plants
Endemic flora of Jamaica
Taxonomy articles created by Polbot
Taxobox binomials not recognized by IUCN